Thomas "Tommy" Brenneck is an American guitarist, record producer, and engineer. He became known as the leader of the Menahan Street Band and a member of The Budos Band, Sharon Jones & The Dap-Kings, and El Michels Affair. He is the founder of Dunham Records, a subsidiary of seminal retro-soul label Daptone Records; he was the producer of soul singer Charles Bradley. As a producer and session musician, he frequently works with Daptone and Big Crown Records artists.

History 
Tom Brenneck was born and raised in Staten Island, New York. He is a self-taught guitarist and joined the original Daptone band The Dap-Kings at the age of 20. He quickly became one of the essential members of the Daptone family, working closely with the label founder and producer Gabe Roth aka Bosco Mann. He played and toured with Sharon Jones who was the label matriarch. Jones gave Brenneck his nickname, “TNT".

Since then Brenneck founded Dunham Records and Studio, cultivated the music and career of the late Charles Bradley (also his son's godfather), performed and recorded with Amy Winehouse, and is a principal in his other Daptone project the Menahan Street Band. He has been a session guitarist, writer, and producer on projects with Lady Gaga, CeeLo Green, Dan Auerbach, Beyoncé & Jay-Z, Josh Tillman AKA Father John Misty, Rufus Wainwright, and Miley Cyrus among others. Additionally Brenneck has played guitar for Amy Winehouse and he is one of the musicians featured on "Telepathy" by Christina Aguilera featuring Nile Rodgers.

As an engineer on Yebba's Dawn, he was nominated for the Grammy Award for Best Engineered Album, Non-Classical at the 64th Annual Grammy Awards.

Dunham Records and recording studios 
Tom Brenneck is the founder of Dunham Records, a subsidiary of Daptone Records. The record label originally operated out of Tom's bedroom in Bushwick, Brooklyn and produced iconic hits from artists including Charles Bradley before eventually moving to a larger space in Williamsburg, Brooklyn.

Brenneck ran a small recording studio out of his home in Bushwick before opening Dunham Sound Studios with Homer Steinwiess in Williamsburg in 2008. The all-analog studio operated with Menahan Street Band as the in-house band and recorded artists including Mark Ronson, Rufus Wainwright, Cee-lo Green, Theophilus London, and Diane Birch among others. In 2014, the studio was succeeded by The Diamond Mine, a recording studio in Long Island City founded with Steinweiss, Nick Movshon, and Leon Michels.

In 2017, Brenneck moved to Los Angeles with his wife and two children. He now works in Los Angeles out of The Sound Factory studio with Mark Ronson, whom he got to know well during his time working with Winehouse.

Discography

Studio albums

EPs

Singles

Other appearances 
"Up From the South" of The Budos Band is featured in a commercial for the NFL Network (2013).

"T.I.B.W.F." of The Budos Band is featured in a series of commercials for 1800 Tequila and in the sixth episode of This American Life.

"The Chicago Falcon (Remix)" of The Budos band is featured on Wale's fourth mixtape, The Mixtape About Nothing (2008).

"Budos Rising" and "The Proposition" of The Budos Band are featured in MLB 09: The Show and MLB 10: The Show, respectively, for PlayStation consoles.

"King Charles" of The Budos Band is featured in episode 37 of the HBO TV series Entourage ("Manic Monday," Season 3).

"Origin of Man," "Up From The South," "T.I.B.W.F." and "Hidden Hand" of The Budos Band are featured in the movie New York, I Love You (2009).

"Mas o Menos", "Ride or Die" and "Scorpion" of The Budos Band are featured on the fictional radio station "Daptone Radio" in the game Sleeping Dogs by United Front Games and Square Enix London. (2012)

"The Volcano Song" of The Budos Band is featured in the documentary I Knew It Was You: Rediscovering John Cazale (2009).

"The Sticks" of The Budos Band is featured in the background of a trailer for Destiny's Dark Below DLC. (2014)

"Say Amen (Saturday Night)" by Panic! At The Disco features an interpolation Of Aphasia off of the album Burnt Offering of The Budos Band.

Production discography

Albums 

 The Budos Band – The Budos Band (Daptone, 2005) (with Bosco Mann)
 The Budos Band – The Budos Band II (Daptone, 2007) (with Bosco Mann)
 Menahan Street Band – Make The Road By Walking (Dunham, 2008)
 The Budos Band – The Budos Band III (Daptone, 2007) (with Bosco Mann)
 Menahan Street Band – The Crossing (Dunham, 2012)
 Charles Bradley – Victim Of Love (Dunham, 2013)
 Low Cut Connie – Hi Honey (Contender Records, 2014)
 The Budos Band – Burnt Offering (Daptone, 2014)  (produced with The Budos Band)
 The Black Box Revelation – Highway Cruiser (Bana Kin, 2015)
 Paul & The Tall Trees – Our Love In The Light (Big Crown, 2016)
 Lee Fields & The Expressions – Special Night (Big Crown, 2016)  (produced with Leon Michels)
 Lady Wray – Queen Alone (Big Crown, 2016) (produced with Leon Michels)
 Charles Bradley – Changes (Dunham, 2016)
 The Sha La Das – Love In The Wind (Dunham, 2018)
 Charles Bradley – Black Velvet (Dunham, 2018)
 The Budos Band – V (Daptone, 2019)
 The Jay Vons – The Word (Daptone, 2019) (produced with Wayne Gordon & The Jay Vons)
 Paul & The Tall Trees – So Long (Big Crown, 2019) (produced with Leon Michels)
 The Budos Band – Long In The Tooth (Dunham, 2020)
 Menahan Street Band – The Exciting Sounds Of Menahan Street Band (Dunham, 2021)

Other tracks 
Other standalone tracks include:

 3 Titans – "College" / "The Life Of A Scholar" (Dunham, 2010) (with Homer Steinwiess)
 The Like – Release Me (Geffen, 2010); 2 tracks (with Mark Ronson)
 CeeLo Green – "Georgia" single (Elektra, 2010)
 Ikebe Shakedown – Ikebe Shakedown (Ubiquity, 2011); 3 tracks
 The Sha La Das – "Sha La Da La La (Christmas Time)" single (Dunham, 2013)
 Black Lips – Underneath The Rainbow (Vice, 2014); 4 tracks
 Paloma Faith – "Price Of Fame" from The Architect (RCA, 2017)  (with Homer Steinwiess)
 Lee Fields & The Expressions – "Time" single (Big Crown, 2017) (produced with Leon Michels)
Charlotte Day Wilson – "I Can Only Whisper" featuring BadBadNotGood from Alpha (2021) (with Wilson)

References

1981 births
Living people
American soul guitarists
American session musicians
21st-century American guitarists
Sharon Jones & The Dap-Kings members